

Countess of East Frisia

House of Cirksena, 1464–1654

Princess of East Frisia

House of Cirksena, 1654–1744

See also

List of Counts of East Frisia
List of East Frisian people

 
 
East Frisia
East Frisia
House of Cirksena